Adam Kotsko (born 1980) is an American theologian, religious scholar, culture critic, and translator, working in the field of political theology. He served as an Assistant Professor of Humanities at Shimer College in Chicago, which was absorbed into North Central College in 2017. He is chiefly known for his interpretative work on philosophers Slavoj Žižek and Giorgio Agamben, as well as his writing on American pop culture. Some of his better-known books include Why We Love Sociopaths (2012), Awkwardness (2010), and Žižek and Theology (2008).

Early life and education
Adam Kotsko was born on July 19, 1980,in Flint, Michigan, and grew up in nearby Davison.

Kotsko earned his Bachelor of Arts degree at Olivet Nazarene University in Bourbonnais, Illinois, in 2002. From there, he went on to the Chicago Theological Seminary (CTS), where he completed a Master of Arts degree in religious studies in 2005, with a thesis in the form of a translation and commentary on Jacques Derrida's essay "Literature in Secret: An Impossible Filiation".

Kotsko completed his Doctor of Philosophy degree in theology, ethics, and culture at CTS in 2009.  His doctoral dissertation was titled Atonement and Ontology and argued that an understanding of atonement theory requires a social-relational ontology.  A modified version of his dissertation was published by Continuum International Publishing Group in 2010 under the title of The Politics of Redemption: The Social Logic of Salvation.

Career
After completing his doctorate in 2009, Kotsko taught for two years at Kalamazoo College, a liberal arts college in Michigan.

In 2011, Kotsko was hired by Shimer College, a small great-books college in Chicago.  He was one of three new Shimer professors hired that year, the school's largest intake of new faculty in more than a decade.  In his first year at Shimer, Kotsko participated in a reworking of the school's upper-level core humanities courses. He also served on numerous committees in Shimer's self-governance body, the Shimer College Assembly. In April 2013, Kotsko was elected parliamentarian of the assembly.

Writing 
Kotsko is known for his writings on the philosopher Slavoj Žižek, whom he has credited for causing him to "break out of one particular intellectual ghetto and into another" by changing his self-identification from "non-Republican" to leftist. His first book, which was published in 2008 was on Žižek, titled Žižek and Theology (the first volume of T&T Clark's "Philosophy and Theology" series). In 2012, Kotsko published a more popular article, "How to Read Žižek" in the Los Angeles Review of Books.

Kotsko has also published three book-length translations of works by Italian philosopher Giorgio Agamben.  He has also published and delivered a number of papers on Agamben.

Kotsko has published three short books on popular culture, Awkwardness: An Essay (2010), Why We Love Sociopaths: A Guide to Late Capitalist Television (2012), and Creepiness (2015). Each book draws out a specific theme found in contemporary American television shows; Awkwardness addressing the curious rise of "awkward humor" in the 21st century, Why We Love Sociopaths addressing the trend toward a certain type of deeply antisocial protagonist, and Creepiness uses a Freudian lens to distinguish a discomfiting strain of popular culture from the topic of the first book.

In 2015, Kotsko was the subject of controversy when he tweeted that all white people, regardless of their ancestry or whether their ancestors owned slaves, are "complicit" in slavery. While the tweets were later deleted, Kotsko has said he stands by his statements. Due to this controversy, Kotsko was named in an online "watch list" of college professors who discriminate against conservative students.

In 2016, Kotsko published a book about the Devil in Christianity, The Prince of This World.

In 2018, Kotsko published a book that examines neoliberalism through the lens of political theology, Neoliberalism's Demons: On the Political Theology of Late Capital.

Kotsko blogs chiefly on a group blog titled An und für sich, but also posts on a personal blog, titled The Weblog.

Books
 Žižek and Theology (2008). .
 Politics of Redemption: The Social Logic of Salvation (2010). .
 Awkwardness: An Essay (2010). .
 Why We Love Sociopaths: A Guide to Late Capitalist Television (2012). .
 Creepiness (2015). .
 Agamben's Coming Philosophy, co-author with Colby Dickinson. (2015). .
 The Prince of This World (2016). .
 Neoliberalism's Demons: On the Political Theology of Late Capital (2018). .

Translations
 The Sacrament of Language: An Archaeology of the Oath (translator) (2011). .
 The Highest Poverty (translator) (2013). .
 Opus Dei: An Archaeology of Duty (translator) (2013). .
 The Use of Bodies (translator) (2016). .
 The Kingdom and the Garden (translator) (2020). .

References

External links
 
 Official faculty profile
 An und für sich
Adam gives his interpretation of several Agamben quotes on The Filter Podcast

1980 births
American bloggers
American male bloggers
American religion academics
Chicago Theological Seminary alumni
Kalamazoo College faculty
Living people
Olivet Nazarene University alumni
People from Davison, Michigan
Religious studies scholars
Shimer College faculty
Writers from Flint, Michigan
Political theologians
Christian continental philosophers and theologians